Alfonso Carlos Chicharro (July 7, 1932 – July 24, 1971) was a Spanish professional wrestler and actor, better known by his ring name Hercules Cortez. He competed in Spanish and other European and North American wrestling promotions including the American Wrestling Association and International Wrestling Alliance and at the time of his death was an incumbent co-holder of the AWA World Tag Team Championship.

Professional wrestling career
Alfonso Carlos Chicharro began his professional career in the 1950s as Pepe Chicharro/Pepe Cortés in Spain.  In 1958, he competed in Canada and the United States using the name Claude Dassary. By 1960, Alfonso had finally settled on the name "Hercules Cortez", as suggested by his wife, Valeri.

A trademark of Hercules Cortez was a giant boulder he brought from Spain which he would place in the ring and dare others to lift.  He traveled all over the world wrestling in many different venues and territories.  He also acted in several films in his native Spain and in some Italian movies.

Death
By 1971, Cortez was wrestling in America and held the AWA World Tag Team Championship with Red Bastien. On July 24, 1971, Hercules Cortez died of injuries suffered in a one-car accident near St. Cloud, Minnesota early in the morning. Cortez and Bastien were returning to Minneapolis-St. Paul after a tag team match in Winnipeg just hours earlier. Hercules, who was reported to have been the passenger of the car, had been scheduled to wrestle Nick Bockwinkel later that day. He was buried in North Royalton, Ohio.

Personal life
Cortez (Alfonso Carlos Chicharro) was born the youngest of 13 children from a prominent family in Spain.  His family suffered much tragedy due to the Spanish civil war including loss of several of his young siblings (all in their teens). As his family survived the war, he was able to attend college as a young man at 'El Escorial' where he studied to be an engineer.  Although he was doing well, and his family was pleased, he kept his love of the outdoors and physical challenges as he grew up tall and strong. Soon, he gained attention for his natural strength, he was offered an opportunity to wrestle and earn some money.  He decided to try it and found he enjoyed it, so he ventured out into the world of wrestling.  During his travels, while in Canada, he met his future wife and mother of his three children.  She was a beautiful young German woman named Waltraud (later changed to Valerie) who did not speak Spanish at that time.  Cortez who was well educated and spoke several languages, was able to speak to her in her native tongue and soon they fell in love, got married and had three children together.  Oldest to youngest; Alfonso (1960), Ricardo (1963) and Maria Dolores (1964).

His wife accompanied him in his travels to many places even bringing along his oldest son until his family grew.  They lived in the United States, then Spain, and finally settling back to the United States.  It was just months after buying a home in the United States (Ohio), that yet another tragedy struck his family as he was killed in a car accident at the young age of 39 years. His wife (31 years old) was left a widow with three young children ages (11 yrs, 8 yrs, and 6 yrs old). His family has remained here in the US to this day.

Championships and accomplishments
American Wrestling Association
AWA World Tag Team Championship (1 time) - with Red Bastien
Cauliflower Alley Club
Posthumous Award (2002)  
International Wrestling Alliance
IWA World Heavyweight Championship (1 time)
Corporacion Internacional de Catch
Spanish Heavyweight Championship (1 time)
World Championship Wrestling (Australia)
IWA World Heavyweight Championship (1 time)

See also

 List of premature professional wrestling deaths

References

External links

The Official Tribute Website to The Mighty Hercules Cortez
Hercules Cortez at Cagematch.net
Hercules Cortez at WrestlingData.com

1932 births
1971 deaths
20th-century professional wrestlers
Spanish male professional wrestlers
Road incident deaths in Minnesota
Stampede Wrestling alumni
AWA World Tag Team Champions
IWA World Heavyweight Champions (Australia)